Cheshmeh Ali (also Romanized as Cheshmeh ‘Alī, Cheshmeh Ālī, and Cheshmeh-ye Ālī) is a village in Golidagh Rural District, Golidagh District, Maraveh Tappeh County, Golestan Province, Iran. At the 2006 census, its population was 528, in 86 families.

References 

Populated places in Maraveh Tappeh County